Infernal Overkill is the debut studio album by German thrash metal band Destruction, released on May 24, 1985.

The album was re-released on February 23, 2018.

Track listing
All songs written by Destruction (Edition Jumar Music).

Personnel
Destruction
Schmier – bass, vocals
Mike Sifringer – guitars
Tommy Sandmann – drums

Production
Produced by Destruction
Engineered by Horst Müller
Mastered by Teldec Press, Berlin
Udo Linke – cover painting
Melvin Bernales – band logo
Odeon Zwo Werbeverlag – back cover design
Frank Stöver – management

References 

Destruction (band) albums
1985 debut albums
SPV/Steamhammer albums